Several genera of the tribe Arctiini of tiger moths are placed as incertae sedis due to the uncertainty of their phylogenetic relationships within the tribe.

Genera
The following genera are not classified in a subtribe.

Amphicallia
Balaca
Baroa
Caribarctia
Curoba
Diospage
Euceriodes
Heliozona
Ilemodes
Ischnarctia
Leucopardus
Mannina
Melora
Omochroa
Stenarctia

References

Arctiini
Lepidoptera incertae sedis